The 1948 Hardin–Simmons Cowboys football team was an American football team that represented Hardin–Simmons University in the Border Conference during the 1948 college football season. In its fifth season under head coach Warren B. Woodson, the team compiled a 6–2–3 record (3–2–1 against conference opponents) and outscored all opponents by a total of 345 to 212.

Schedule

References

Hardin-Simmons
Hardin–Simmons Cowboys football seasons
Hardin-Simmons Cowboys football